Shyama Prasad Mukherji College commonly known as SPM College, is a constituent college of the University of Delhi. The all-women's college was founded in 1969 and named after Syama Prasad Mukherjee.

The college offers undergraduate and post-graduate courses in Humanities and Commerce streams. The college also offers Teachers Training Programmes - B.Ed & B.El.Ed -  and is among the few colleges of University of Delhi to offer the course outside the Central Institute of Education (CIE), University of Delhi.

Campus

Connectivity and accessibility 
SPM College is located in Punjabi Bagh (West), New Delhi. The college is well connected by the Shivaji Park Metro Station on the Green Line of the Delhi metro network. Special provisions for differently-abled students and staff members such as ramps, wheel chairs, washrooms, special pavements are in place within the college premises. Braille plates with QR codes are also displayed outside every room.

Facilities 
Library and Reading Room: The college maintains a double storey library in a separate wing for the college students. The Library remains opens throughout the year from 8.30 a.m. to 5.30 p.m. except on Saturdays and Sundays. It has a collection of about 61,619 books on various subjects and 95 periodicals.

College Auditorium: The Auditorium is fully air-conditioned and has a seating capacity of approx. 1200 students. The auditorium is named after erstwhile Prime Minister of India, as 'Rajiv Gandhi Auditorium'.

College Seminar Hall: The college hall is the venue for multiple activities throughout the year.

Medical Room: The college maintains an adequately equipped Medical room. A qualified part-time physician and nurse attend to the needs of the students in the college.

College Canteen: The college provides a comfortable canteen for the students. Outsiders are not permitted in the college canteen.

Family Counseling Centre: The center provides counseling, referral and rehabilitative services to those who are facing problems in their family lives, or have been victims of traumatic experiences or social discrimination.

College Magazine: The college published a multi-lingual magazine ‘SHYAMA’ every year.

Bank: A branch of Indian Overseas Bank operates in the college.

Students Common Room: The College has a common room facility for students.

The labs, seminar hall, and classrooms are equipped with projectors.

Administration 
According to the provisions of statute 30(1)(c)(i) of Delhi University Act, 1922, the governing body is chosen through public nomination of people from various academic and non-academic backgrounds. There are designated committees, and their management is supervised by the Principal. The affairs of the college is jointly managed by the governing body, academic council, and the executive council of the University of Delhi.

The present Principal (Acting) of the college is Dr. Sadhna Sharma

Academics

Academic programmes

Undergraduate courses 
The college offers the three year Undergraduate Programme of Delhi University in Arts, Humanities, Commerce, Mathematics and Computer Science.

General
 B.A. Programme
 B.Com Programme

Honours
 B.Com (H)
 B.A.(H) Hindi
 B.A.(H) English
 B.A.(H) Sanskrit
 B.A.(H) Political Science
 B.A.(H) History
 B.A.(H) Economics
 B.A.(H) Philosophy
 B.A.(H) Applied Psychology
 B.Sc. Mathematics
 B. Sc. Computer Science
 B.A.(H). Geography

Post Graduate Courses 
 M.A. Hindi
 M.A. Political Science
 M.A. Sanskrit

Professional Courses 
 B.El.Ed
 B.Ed.

Short term courses
The short term courses include: 
 Certificate Course in Counselling and Psychotherapy
 Textile designing including Tie and Dye; Batik, fabric Painting
 Cutting and Tailoring
 Embroidery
 Dress Designing  & Drafting
 Beauty culture
 Secretarial Practice Course (Stenography English)

Admission 
The student demography of SPM is heterogeneous. Admission to the college is undertaken through the centralized University admission every year from June to July. Reservations are followed as per government norms in the admission process. In the Year 2020 the months of admission might differ due to pandemic situation across the world.

Placement 
The college has an active placement cell and through the Central Placement Cell of the University, many students of SPM have been placed in various companies such as IGATE PATNI, TCS, Wipro, Alentra System, ATOS over the years.

Centre 
Under the EPOCH making social thinkers of India programme by the University Grants Commission (UGC), Shyama Prasad Mukherji College has a Gandhi Study Centre, Buddhist Study Centre and Guru Nanak Study Centre - that offer certificate courses.

Besides full-time courses, the college also runs study centres for the Non-Collegiate Women’s Education Board and the School of Open Learning.

Student life 
The college conducts activities such as sports, NSS, NCC and other ECAs. These societies are active throughout the year and organize competitions, seminars, conferences and workshops at college/inter-college levels.

References

External links 
 

Universities and colleges in Delhi
Delhi University
Educational institutions established in 1969
1969 establishments in Delhi